Gabriello Carotti (born November 25, 1960 in Orbetello) is an Italian former footballer who played as a midfielder. He made 169 appearances in the Italian professional leagues, and played for 6 seasons (94 games, 11 goals) in Serie A for Milan and Ascoli.

References

1960 births
Living people
Italian footballers
Association football midfielders
A.C. Milan players
Ascoli Calcio 1898 F.C. players
L.R. Vicenza players
A.C. Reggiana 1919 players
Serie A players
Serie B players
S.G. Gallaratese A.S.D. players
People from Orbetello
Sportspeople from the Province of Grosseto
Footballers from Tuscany